Below are the results for season 11 (XI) of the World Poker Tour. These events happened between August 4, 2012, and May 24, 2013.

Results

Merit Cyprus Classic
 Casino: Merit Crystal Cove Hotel and Casino, Alsancak Mevkii Kyrenia, Cyprus
 Buy-in: $4,000 + $400
 6-Day Event: August 4–9, 2012
 Number of Entries: 329
 Total Prize Pool: $1,212,694
 Number of Payouts: 36

Parx Open Poker Classic
 Casino: Parx Casino, Bensalem, Pennsylvania
 Buy-in: $3,300 + $200
 6-Day Event: August 10–15, 2012
 Number of Entries: 500
 Total Prize Pool: $1,600,500
 Number of Payouts: 54

Legends of Poker
 Casino: The Bicycle Casino, Bell Gardens, California
 Buy-in: $3,500 + $200
 6-Day Event: August 24–29, 2012
 Number of Entries: 622
 Total Prize Pool: $2,111,690
 Number of Payouts: 63

Grand Prix de Paris
 Casino: Aviation Club de France, Paris, France
 Buy-in: €7,500
 6-Day Event: Sep 10–15, 2012
 Number of Entries: 228
 Total Prize Pool: €1,624,500
 Number of Payouts: 27

WPT Malta
 Casino: Casino at Portomaso, Portomaso
 Buy-in: €3,000 + €300
 5-Day Event: Sep 16–20, 2012
 Number of Entries: 169
 Total Prize Pool: €643,641
 Number of Payouts: 21

Borgata Poker Open
 Casino: Borgata Hotel Casino, Atlantic City, New Jersey
 Buy-in: $3,300 + $200
 6-Day Event: Sep 16–21, 2012
 Number of Entries: 1,181
 Total Prize Pool: $3,897,300
 Number of Payouts: 110

WPT Emperors Palace Poker Classic
 Casino: Emperors Palace Hotel Casino Convention Entertainment Resort, Johannesburg
 Buy-in: $3,300 + $300
 5-Day Event: Oct 22–26, 2012
 Number of Entries: 230
 Total Prize Pool: $759,000
 Number of Payouts: 27

bestbet Jacksonville Fall Poker Scramble
 Casino: BestBet Jacksonville, Jacksonville, Florida
 Buy-in: $3,200 + $300 
 5-Day Event: Nov 9–13, 2012
 Number of Entries: 477
 Total Prize Pool: $1,526,400
 Number of Payouts: 45

WPT Copenhagen
 Casino: Casino Copenhagen, Copenhagen, Denmark	
 Buy-in: DKr 24,000 + 2,250
 6-Day Event: Nov 12–17, 2012
 Number of Entries: 229
 Total Prize Pool: DKr 5,496,000
 Number of Payouts: 27

WPT Montréal
 Casino: Playground Poker Club, Kahnawake, Canada	
 Buy-in: $3,000 + $300
 5-Day Event: Nov 23–27, 2012
 Number of Entries: 1,173
 Total Prize Pool: $3,387,930
 Number of Payouts: 117

WPT Mazagan
 Casino: Mazagan Beach and Golf Resort, El Jadida, Morocco	
 Buy-in: €3,200 + €300
 5-Day Event: Nov 27 – Dec 1, 2012
 Number of Entries: 146
 Total Prize Pool: €438,253 
 Number of Payouts: 18

WPT Prague
 Casino: Corinthia Casino, Prague, Czech Republic	
 Buy-in: €3,000 + €300
 7-Day Event: Dec 3–9, 2012
 Number of Entries: 567
 Total Prize Pool: €1,684,295
 Number of Payouts: 72

Five Diamond World Poker Classic
 Casino: Bellagio, Las Vegas	
 Buy-in: $10,000 + $300
 6-Day Event: Dec 4–9, 2012
 Number of Entries: 503
 Total Prize Pool: $4,879,100
 Number of Payouts: 54

Borgata Winter Poker Open
 Casino: Borgata Hotel Casino, Atlantic City, New Jersey
 Buy-in: $3,300 + $200
 6-Day Event: Jan 27 – Feb 1, 2013
 Number of Entries: 1,042
 Total Prize Pool: $3,335,442
 Number of Payouts: 100

WPT Lucky Hearts Poker Open
 Casino: Seminole Hard Rock Hotel and Casino, Hollywood, Florida
 Buy-in: $3,250 + $250
 5-Day Event: Feb 8–12, 2013
 Number of Entries: 369
 Total Prize Pool: $1,199,250
 Number of Payouts: 36

WPT Baden
 Casino: Casino Baden, Baden, Austria
 Buy-in: €3,300
 6-Day Event: Feb 19–24, 2013
 Number of Entries: 254
 Total Prize Pool: €1,031,142
 Number of Payouts: 27

L.A. Poker Classic
 Casino: Commerce Casino, Commerce, California
 Buy-in: $10,000
 6-Day Event: Feb 23–28, 2013
 Number of Entries: 517
 Total Prize Pool: $4,963,200
 Number of Payouts: 63

Bay 101 Shooting Star
 Casino: Bay 101, San Jose, California
 Buy-in: $7,500
 5-Day Event: March 4–8, 2013
 Number of Entries: 643
 Total Prize Pool: $4,597,450
 Number of Payouts: 63

WPT Venice Grand Prix
 Casino: Casino di Venezia, Venice, Italy
 Buy-in: €3,000 + €300
 6-Day Event: March 25–30, 2013
 Number of Entries: 173
 Total Prize Pool: €519,000
 Number of Payouts: 21

WPT Barcelona
 Casino: Casino Barcelona, Barcelona, Spain
 Buy-in: €3,200 + €300
 6-Day Event: April 5–10, 2013
 Number of Entries: 249
 Total Prize Pool: €796,800
 Number of Payouts: 27

Seminole Hard Rock Showdown
 Casino: Seminole Hard Rock Hotel and Casino Hollywood, Hollywood, Florida
 Buy-in: $5,000
 6-Day Event: April 11–16, 2013
 Number of Entries: 542
 Total Prize Pool: $2,547,000
 Number of Payouts: 54

bestbet Open
 Casino: bestbet Jacksonville, Jacksonville, Florida
 Buy-in: $3,500
 5-Day Event: April 26–30, 2013
 Number of Entries: 351
 Total Prize Pool: $1,123,204
 Number of Payouts: 36

Canadian Spring Championship
 Casino: Playground Poker Club, Kahnawake, Quebec
 Buy-in: $3,300
 7-Day Event: May 3–9, 2013
 Number of Entries: 735
 Total Prize Pool: $2,121,244
 Number of Payouts: 72

WPT World Championship
 Casino: Bellagio, Las Vegas
 Buy-in: $25,000
 7-Day Event: May 18–24, 2013
 Number of Entries: 146
 Total Prize Pool: $3,540,500
 Number of Payouts: 15

References

World Poker Tour
2012 in poker
2013 in poker